Chris Moore was  CEO of Domino's Pizza UK & IRL plc between January 2008 and December 2011. He stepped down on 25 December 2011 and was replaced by Lance Batchelor.

He helped set up Domino's Pizza UK & IRL plc master franchise in 1993, and was promoted to CEO in 2008.

Early days

Chris Moore was born in Weymouth, Dorset but moved to Brazil when he was 17.

Career

1980s Account Director for Mccann Erickson Brasil (advertising).
1990   Marketing Manager  - Domino's - To help set up a European marketing operation run by its US parent.  
1993   Helped set a UK and Ireland master franchise 
1999   Joined board of Directors
2007   COO, Domino's Pizza UK & IRL plc
2008   CEO, Domino's Pizza UK & IRL plc.

References

English businesspeople
Living people
Year of birth missing (living people)